Faroese music is primarily vocal, accompanied by the fiddle (which arrived in the 17th century) and European dances like the minuet and polka. During the twentieth century choirs have played an important role in the musical history of the Faroes, and some of the best known current choirs are Tarira, Havnarkórið, Tórshavnar Manskór, Ljómur, Fuglafjarðar Gentukór, and the choirs situated in Copenhagen: Húsakórið and Mpiri.

History 
Much of the imported music and instruments remained popular only in the capital and largest city, Tórshavn.  Rural peoples remained true to traditions of chain dance and ballads.  The three types of dance ballads are kvæði, tættir and vísur.  Many of these dance forms were revived after World War 2, when a number of dance societies were formed.  The ballads were largely compiled in Corpus Carminum Færoensium, which collected over 44,000 stanzas.

Other songs include skjaldur, fantastic fairy tales sung by adults for children, and pitch-sliding, microtonal hymns called kingosálmar. In her magnum opus about Faroese folk singing, Marianne Clausen comprehensively described the various genres, and presented about 3,300 music transcriptions of folk singing melodies.

Modern musicians 
Modern Faroese musicians who have fused native traditions with music from Scotland, Bulgaria and the Sami people of northern Scandinavia:

Kristian Blak
Enekk
Gunnar
Annika Hoydal
Lennart Kullgren 

Other well known Faroese musicians include: 

Eivør Pálsdóttir
Teitur Lassen
Lena Anderssen
Høgni Lisberg
Høgni Reistrup
Guðrið Hansdóttir
Greta Svabo Bech
Petur Pólson
Terji Rasmussen
Arnold Ludvig
Evi Tausen
Hallur Joensen
Hanus G. Johansen
Elin Brimheim Heinesen
Heine Lützen
Ólavur Jakobsen
Kári av Reyni
Kári P.
Alex Bærendsen
Regin Dahl
Davur Juul Magnussen
Simon Von Konoy
Ólavur Olsen
Eyðun Nolsøe
Guðrun Sólja Jacobsen
Kári Sverisson
Steintór Rasmussen
Anna Katrin Egilstrøð
Brandur Enni
Linda Andrews
Lyon Hansen
Jens Marni Hansen
Uni Arge
Leivur Thomsen
Jóannes Lamhauge

Modern bands 
Well known Faroese bands include (in alphabetical order) 

200
Analog Norð
Arnold Ludvig Sextet
Boys In A Band
Byrta
Clickhaze
Danny & The Veetos
Deiggj
Devon
The Dreams
Eivør
Faroe Boys
Frændur
Gestir
the Ghost 
Glóð
Goodiepal
Hamferð
Hamradun 
Heidrik
Heljareyga
Hjarnar
Høgni Reistrup
Kiasmos
Lama Sea
Lena

Makrel
Marius
Moirae (band)
Mold
MonkeyRat
MC-Hár
Nalja
Oniontree
ORKA
Páll Finnur Páll
Present Past

Sic
Safir
Side Effect
The Story Ends
Swangah
Synarchy
Teitur
Týr
Valravn
Yggdrasil

Modern classical composers 
There are also some quite famous Faroese classical composers. Sunleif Rasmussen is until now the only Faroese ever to have written a symphony. Other composers are Kristian Blak, Edvard N. Debess, Janus Rasmussen, Tróndur Bogason, Kári Bæk, Palli Hansen, Knút Olsen and Pauli í Sandágerði.

Classical ensemble Aldubáran has commissioned and performed a vast amount of  music from Faroese composers and performed it domestically and abroad.

Details on specific musicians and groups

Gestir 
Gestir are signed to Tutl Records in the Faroe Islands. They were formed in 2002, and have been playing rock festivals in the Faroe Islands,  Denmark and other countries.  Their long-awaited debut album Burtur frá Toftunum was released in the Faroe Islands in July 2006.   In the summer of 2006 Gestir played the "Atlantic Music Event" at NASA (Reykjavik, Iceland), the G! Festival (Gota, Faroe Islands) and Nord-Atlantiske Brygge (Copenhagen, Denmark). On September 30, 2006 Gestir performed a special concert at the Nordic House, Torshavn, Faroe Islands, in celebration of their album release. In December 2006 Gestir were invited to play at faroese singer/songwriter Teitur´s special Christmas show at Store Vega, Copenhagen. Gestir's most significant concerts in the summer of 2005 were the G! Festival and at Lille Vega, Copenhagen. Gestir won the bi-annual Faroese music contest Prix Føroyar in 2003.

The members of Gestir are Ólavur Jákupsson (vocals, electric & acoustic guitars, synthesizers, piano), Torfinnur Jákupsson (electric & acoustic guitars, piano, lyrics), Jógvan Andreas á Brúnni (drums), Niels Jákup i Jógvanstovu (bass) and Knút Háberg Eysturstein (synthesizers, hammond, piano, rhodes).

Aldubáran 

The chamber ensemble Aldubáran is the only professional ensemble of its kind in the Faroe Islands. Formed in 1995, it has had a huge impact on the modern classical scene in the Faroe Islands. The purpose of Aldubáran was to perform classical music and to commission Faroese music from composers and to perform this domestically and abroad. Since its formation, the ensemble has become a household name. Especially the collaboration with folk-singer Hanus G. Johansen and their release in 2000 of album Bouquet on the label Tutl, had a broad impact, and still is a big seller. Since then Aldubáran has released four albums on Tutl. Aldubáran was in 2004 nominated for the Nordic Council Music Prize. Aldubáran has toured extensively and in autumn 2006, Aldubáran produced and played the first ever Faroese opera The Madmans' Garden by composer Sunleif Rasmussen. The members of Aldubáran are: Andrea Heindriksdóttir (flute), Anna Klett (clarinet), Páll Sólstein (horn), Joost Bosdijk (bassoon), Sámal Petersen, Øssur Bæk, Jón Festirstein (violins), Angelika Hansen (viola), Andreas T Restorff (cello), Ólavur Olsen (trumpet), Johan Hentze (trumpet), Kristina Thede Johansen (saxophone), Ólavur Jakobsen (guitar), Jóhannes Andreasen (piano), and Bernharður Wilkinson (conductor).

Týr 

A folk metal band with progressive elements, whose members hail from the Faroes.  The band is known for performing traditional Faroese material both live and on recordings.  They compose songs in both Faroese and English, often with Viking or Pagan subject matter.  

The group has released seven albums since their founding in 1998 and they perform worldwide.

Record labels
Tutl Records is the major record label of the Faroe Islands

Music festivals in the Faroe Islands 
 G! Festival
 Tórshavn Jazz Festival
 Summarfestivalurin

References
 Cronshaw, Andrew. "A New Pulse for the Pols". 2000.  In Broughton, Simon and Ellingham, Mark  with McConnachie, James and Duane, Orla (Ed.), World Music, Vol. 1: Africa, Europe and the Middle East, pp 58–63. Rough Guides Ltd, Penguin Books.

External links 
 Musicfromthefaroeislands - Faroe Islands Alliance for Music Export
 MUSIC.fo - Faroese music portal
 Tutl - Faroese music online
 Gfestival- The official website of the annual G! Festival!
 Summarfestivalur- The official website of the annual Summerfestival